Christmas Special may refer to:

 "Christmas Special" (30 Rock), an episode of the American television comedy series 30 Rock
 "Christmas Special" (The Naked Brothers Band), an episode of the musical comedy series The Naked Brothers Band
 "Christmas Special" (Beavis and Butt-head episode)
 "Christmas Special" (Robot Chicken episode)
 "The Christmas Special", an episode of the animated comedy series Regular Show
 Christmas Special (album)
 S Club 7: Christmas Special, a one-off TV special by UK pop group S Club 7